Francisco Raúl Cáceres Anillo, usually credited as Raulo Cáceres  (born February 20, 1976) is a Spanish comic artist. He is best known for his work at Avatar Press, in particular providing art for titles by Warren Ellis.

Biography

He studied Fine Arts in Sevilla and Granada and, starting in the early 1990s, he has been published in a number of local fanzines.

In Spain his best known work is the horror comic Elizabeth Bathory, reprinted by Eros Comix, who have also published his Morbid Tales and a reworking of de Sade's Justine and Juliette.

He started his American career in 2007 with Avatar Press, with Warren Ellis on Gravel, Crécy and Captain Swing and the Electrical Pirates of Cindery Island, then on the franchise Crossed with various writers. He's currently working with Max Brooks on The Extinction Parade.

Bibliography

Comics
Comic work includes:
Elizabeth Bathory (in Wetcomix, 1999, republished by Eros Comix, 2002–2007)
Justine y Juliette (in Wetcomix, republished by Eros Comix, 140 pages, 2005)
Morbid Tales (Eros Comix, 2004)
Belladonna (with Brian Pulido, Avatar Press, 2007)
2001 Maniacs Hornbook (with Mike Wolfer, Avatar Press, July, 2007)
Crécy (with Warren Ellis, graphic novel, Avatar Press, 2007)
Gravel (with Warren Ellis/Mike Wolfer, mini-series, Avatar Press, 2007-2008)
Lady Death Swimsuit 2007 (with various artists, one-shot, Avatar Press, December 2007)
Captain Swing and the Electrical Pirates of Cindery Island (with Warren Ellis, miniseries, Avatar Press, 2010-2011)
Crossed: Psychopath (with David Lapham, miniseries, Avatar Press, 2011)
Crossed: Badlands #19-20 (with Simon Spurrier) (2012), #25-28 (with Garth Ennis) (2013), Avatar Press
The Extinction Parade (with Max Brooks, miniseries, Avatar Press, 2013-2014)

Covers
He has also provided covers for other comic books including:
Doktor Sleepless #1-13 (2007–2009)
Crossed: Badlands (2012-present)

Notes

References

Raúlo at Lambiek's Comiclopedia

External links
Home page 
Avatar Press profile
Comic Vine profile
GRAVEL artist Raulo Caceres talks about Ellis, Wolfer, and their upcoming series with Avatar

1976 births
Living people
Spanish comics artists
20th-century Spanish artists
Avatar Press